Iran participated in the 2012 Asian Beach Games in Haiyang, China on 16–22 July 2012.

Competitors

Medal summary

Medal table

Medalists

Results by event

Beach kabaddi

Men

Beach soccer

Men

Beach volleyball

Men

Roller speed skating

Men

References

External links
 Official site

Nations at the 2012 Asian Beach Games
2012
Asian Beach Games